Samuel Voinoff (February 22, 1907 – November 17, 1989) was an American college football and golf coach at Purdue University. He coached Purdue to 10 Big Ten titles and one NCAA national championship in golf. He was the president of the Golf Coaches Association of America from 1962–64 and 1970–71. He is a 1995 Boilermaker Hall of Fame inductee.

Head coaching record

References

1907 births
1989 deaths
Purdue Boilermakers football coaches
Purdue Boilermakers football players
Purdue Boilermakers men's golf coaches
People from Sullivan County, Indiana